João Paulo Nunes Capote (born 9 December 1975), nicknamed Canita is a retired Portuguese football midfielder. He played on the Portuguese second tier for Naval.

References

1975 births
Living people
Portuguese footballers
Associação Naval 1º de Maio players
C.D. Feirense players
S.C. Pombal players
Académico de Viseu F.C. players
F.C. Oliveira do Hospital players
G.D. Sourense players
Association football midfielders
Segunda Divisão players
People from Figueira da Foz
Sportspeople from Coimbra District